Santa Cecilia is a district of the La Cruz canton, in the Guanacaste province of Costa Rica.

Geography 
Santa Cecilia has an area of  km² and an elevation of  metres.

Villages
Administrative center of the district is the village of Santa Cecilia.

Other villages in the district are Armenia, Belice, Bellavista, Brisas, Caoba, Esperanza, Flor del Norte, Lajosa, Marías, Palmares, San Antonio, San Cristóbal, San Rafael, San Vicente, Santa Elena, Sardina, and Virgen.

Demographics 

For the 2011 census, Santa Cecilia had a population of  inhabitants.

Transportation

Road transportation 
The district is covered by the following road routes:
 National Route 4
 National Route 170

References 

Districts of Guanacaste Province
Populated places in Guanacaste Province